The 2014 Connecticut gubernatorial election took place on November 4, 2014, to elect the governor and lieutenant governor of Connecticut, concurrently with elections to the United States Senate in other states and elections to the United States House of Representatives and various state and local elections.

Incumbent Democratic Governor Dannel Malloy won re-election to a second term in office. Connecticut, unlike most states, holds separate primary elections for governor and lieutenant governor, with the winners then running together on the same ticket.

Malloy and incumbent Lieutenant Governor Nancy Wyman were renominated unopposed. The Republicans nominated former U.S. Ambassador to Ireland and nominee for governor in 2010 Thomas C. Foley and Groton Town Councilor Heather Somers, making the contest a rematch of the 2010 election. Independent candidate Joe Visconti, a former West Hartford Town Councilor and the Republican nominee for Connecticut's 1st congressional district in 2008 was running with Chester Harris, a former Republican Haddam School Board Member. Visconti suspended his campaign on November 2 and endorsed Foley. However, due to the suspension coming only two days before the election, Visconti's name remained on the ballot. Former State Representative Jonathan Pelto (D-Mansfield)  explored a third-party candidacy through a petition drive but was disqualified due to an inadequate number of signatures.

Democratic primary

Governor

Candidates

Declared
 Dannel Malloy, incumbent Governor

Withdrew
 Lee Whitnum, writer, candidate for Connecticut's 4th congressional district in 2008 and candidate for the U.S. Senate in 2010 and 2012

Lieutenant Governor

Candidates

Declared
 Nancy Wyman, incumbent Lieutenant Governor

Results
Malloy and Wyman ran unopposed for the Democratic nomination, so no primaries were held.

Republican primary

Governor
2010 nominee Thomas C. Foley won the endorsement of the state party at the Republican State Convention on May 17, winning 57.1% of the vote. Danbury Mayor Mark Boughton and State Senate Minority Leader John McKinney took 22.3% and 17.72%, respectively, meeting the 15% vote threshold and thus also qualified for the primary ballot. Shelton Mayor Mark Lauretti and former West Hartford Town Councilor Joe Visconti failed to get 15% of the vote at the convention, so neither automatically qualified for the ballot. Visconti began collecting signatures to petition his way onto the ballot. He needed the signatures of 8,190 registered Republican voters by June 10 in order to qualify and he started collecting signatures when primary petitions became available at the end of April. Lauretti began to collect signatures a few days after the convention, but withdrew those petitions on May 22 to instead try to petition onto the ballot for lieutenant governor.

On June 6, Visconti announced that he was short of the required number of signatures, and with the filing deadline only 4 days away, was withdrawing from the race to run as an Independent instead. Boughton suspended his campaign on June 18, primarily because he did not think Lauretti, his unofficial running mate, would qualify for the ballot, which would have meant Boughton failing to qualify for public financing. He called for "party unity behind the endorsed Republican candidate, Tom Foley."

Candidates

Declared

 Thomas C. Foley, former U.S. Ambassador to Ireland and nominee for governor in 2010
 John P. McKinney, Minority Leader of the Connecticut Senate

Withdrew

 Toni Boucher, state senator
 Mark Boughton, Mayor of Danbury and nominee for lieutenant governor in 2010
 Martha Dean, nominee for Connecticut Attorney General in 2002 and 2010
 Mark Lauretti, Mayor of Shelton (ran for Lieutenant Governor)
 Joe Visconti, former West Hartford Town Councilor and nominee for Connecticut's 1st congressional district in 2008 (running as unaffiliated)

Declined

 Lawrence F. Cafero, Minority Leader of the Connecticut House of Representatives
 Michael Fedele, former lieutenant governor and candidate for governor in 2010 (running for Mayor of Stamford)
 Pauline R. Kezer, former Secretary of the State of Connecticut
 Linda McMahon, businesswoman and nominee for the U.S. Senate in 2010 and 2012
 Chris Shays, former U.S. Representative and candidate for the U.S. Senate in 2012

Polling

Results

Lieutenant Governor
Although separate primary elections are held for governor and lieutenant governor, candidates for each office often join together to form unofficial "tickets". Heather Bond Somers had originally been running on such a "ticket" with Mark Boughton, but she withdrew from the arrangement. Boughton later announced Mark Lauretti as his new running mate. This arrangement came to an end when Boughton withdrew, primarily because he did not think Lauretti would qualify for the ballot, which would have meant Boughton failing to qualify for public financing. David M. Walker teamed up with John P. McKinney. Bacchiochi did not join any "ticket".

Bacchiochi won the endorsement of the state party at the Republican State Convention on May 17, winning 50.9% of the vote. Somers took 31.5% and Walker got 17.4%, meaning they both also qualified for the primary ballot. Lauretti attempted to petition his way onto the ballot; he was unsuccessful, filing only 6,723 of the required 8,190 signatures.

Candidates

Declared
 Penny Bacchiochi, state representative
Heather Bond Somers, Groton Town Councilor and former Mayor of Groton
 David M. Walker, former Comptroller General of the United States

Withdrew
 Mark Lauretti, Mayor of Shelton

Results

Independents

Candidates

Withdrew
 Joe Visconti, former West Hartford Town Councilor and Republican nominee for Connecticut's 1st congressional district in 2008
Running mate: Chester Harris, former Republican Haddam School Board Member

Disqualified
 Jonathan Pelto, Democratic former state representative
Running mate: Ebony Murphy-Root, teacher

General election

Debates
Complete video of debate, August 27, 2014 - C-SPAN
Complete video of debate, October 2, 2014 - C-SPAN

Predictions

Polling

Results

See also
 2014 United States gubernatorial elections

References

External links
 Connecticut gubernatorial election, 2014 at Ballotpedia

Official campaign websites (Archived)
 Dannel Malloy for Governor incumbent
 Mark Boughton for Governor
 Tom Foley for Governor
 Mark Lauretti for Governor
 John McKinney for Governor
 Joe Visconti for Governor

Gubernatorial
2014
2014 United States gubernatorial elections